Cambra was a mythical British queen; Cambra may also refer to:

CAMBRA, an acronym for Caries Management by Risk Assessment
Gary Cambra, American musician
Cambra, Pennsylvania, an unincorporated community

See also
Luisa María Arvide Cambra
Miquel Àngel Múrcia i Cambra
Vale de Cambra